Malini Laxmansingh Gaur (born 19 June 1961) is an Indian politician serving as the mayor of Indore. She is a member of the Bharatiya Janata Party. She became mayor in February 2015 by defeating her nearest rival Archana Jaiswal of Indian National Congress by 2.8 lakh votes. Consequently, she became only the second woman to do so after Umashashi Sharma. Her husband Laxman Singh Gaur, was the former higher education minister of Madhya Pradesh who died in a car accident near Dewas in February 2008.

References

External links

Mayors of places in Madhya Pradesh
Bharatiya Janata Party politicians from Madhya Pradesh
Madhya Pradesh MLAs 2008–2013
21st-century Indian women politicians
21st-century Indian politicians
1961 births
Living people
Politicians from Indore
Madhya Pradesh MLAs 2013–2018
Madhya Pradesh MLAs 2018–2023
Women members of the Madhya Pradesh Legislative Assembly